Aliağa is a town and a district of Izmir Province in the Aegean Region of Turkey. Aliağa has a large port, mainly for oil and bulk cargo. Its economic activity is based on tourism, shipbreaking, and an oil refinery.

Overview and history
Aliağa lies in the heart of ancient Aeolia. The town was named after a member of the influential Karaosmanoğulları ayan family, Karaosmanoğlu Ali Ağa, who owned an estate here. It was a township in Menemen district in 1937 and became a municipality in 1952. It finally separated from Menemen and became a district on 21 January 1982.

The remains of the ancient city of Myrina are within the boundaries of the district, located at about fifteen km north of Aliağa centre. Visitors also often use the road from Aliağa to visit the remains of Aigai in Yuntdağı in Manisa Province.

In 2021, a monastery and floor mosaic have been found during an illegal excavation. Archaeologists believe that the monastery was used in the 4th century to the 14th century.

Economy and geography
The D.550 roadway runs through the city, between Muğla-Edirne and also to İzmir. Aliağa is also connected to İzmir by İZBAN, a commuter railway operating around İzmir. İZBAN operates 15 daily trains from Aliağa Railway Station to Alsancak Terminal in İzmir. ESHOT operates the 740 bus line to İzmir as well.

Ship-breaking
There are several facilities for dismantling and scrapping ships.
The 2020 COVID-19 pandemic sped up the process of ship recycling because owners of idled cruise ships looked to stem the red ink.

Gallery

See also
 Petkim
 Aigai (Aeolian)
 Egegaz Aliağa LNG Storage Facility
 Kyme
 Gryneion

References

Populated coastal places in Turkey
Towns in Turkey
Aegean Sea port cities and towns in Turkey
Populated places in İzmir Province
Fishing communities in Turkey
 
Ship breaking
Districts of İzmir Province